Josef Schäffer (born July 2, 1891 in Moravia) was an Austrian track and field athlete who competed in the 1912 Summer Olympics. He competed in the decathlon, shot put, discus throw and two-handed discus throw. He finished tenth in the decathlon, throwing the second-furthest in the discus on his way to his score of 6568.585. In the shot put, he finished thirteenth. In the discus throw, he only managed to come twenty-ninth in the regular discus throw, but came sixteenth in the two-handed discus.

See also 
 Austria at the 1912 Summer Olympics

References

External links
 

1891 births
Austrian decathletes
Austrian shot putters
Austrian male discus throwers
Olympic athletes of Austria
Athletes (track and field) at the 1912 Summer Olympics
Year of death missing
Olympic decathletes